Making Music is an album by Indian tabla player and composer Zakir Hussain featuring  Jan Garbarek, John McLaughlin and Hariprasad Chaurasia, recorded in 1986 and released on the ECM label.

Reception
The Allmusic review by Michael G. Nastos awarded the album 2½ stars stating "World fusion/jazz group falls short of its great potential".

Track listing
All compositions by Zakir Hussain except as indicated
 "Making Music" - 12:31 
 "Zakir" (John McLaughlin) - 6:23 
 "Water Girl" - 3:52 
 "Toni" - 3:51 
 "Anisa" - 9:14 
 "Sunjog" - 7:36 
 "You and Me" (Hussain, McLaughlin) - 2:12 
 "Sabah" - 3:35 
Recorded at Rainbow Studio in Oslo, Norway in December 1986

Personnel
Zakir Hussain — tabla, percussion, voice 
Hariprasad Chaurasia — flutes
Jan Garbarek — tenor saxophone, soprano saxophone
John McLaughlin — acoustic guitar

References

ECM Records albums
Zakir Hussain (musician) albums
1987 albums
Albums produced by Manfred Eicher